Cash is an unincorporated community in Gordon County, Georgia, United States. Cash is located on County Road 373 east of Calhoun, and between Sonoraville and Red Bud.

History
A post office called Cash was established in 1889, and remained in operation until being discontinued in 1903. The community took its name from a sign at the general store that read "Cash or nothing."

References

Unincorporated communities in Gordon County, Georgia
Unincorporated communities in Georgia (U.S. state)